Rhinella quechua is a species of toad in the family Bufonidae. It is endemic to Bolivia. Its natural habitats are subtropical or tropical moist montane forests, rivers, freshwater marshes, and intermittent freshwater marshes. It is threatened by habitat loss.

References

quechua
Amphibians of Bolivia
Amphibians described in 1961
Endemic fauna of Bolivia
Taxonomy articles created by Polbot